Neb may refer to:
Neb, transcription of an ancient Egyptian hieroglyph of a basket, Gardiner sign V30
Neb, the pen name of British political cartoonist Ronald Niebour (1903–1972)

NEB may refer to:
Nose in Everyone's Business, a busybody or gossip
National Enterprise Board, a UK government body from 1975 to 1981
National Energy Board, a Canadian independent federal agency from 1959 to 2018
National Examination Board (Nepal), organizes the Higher Secondary examination in Nepal
Nebulin, a large protein found in muscles
New England Biolabs, U.S. corporation, produces and supplies reagents for the life science industry
New English Bible, a translation of the Bible, first published as a complete edition in 1970
Niederbarnimer Eisenbahn, a train company in Germany
North Equatorial belt, a Cloud pattern on Jupiter
Nuclear Energy Board, an Irish government agency from 1973 to 1992
Noise Equivalent Bandwidth, a measure of the bandwidth of an electrical filter
Nudged Elastic Band, a way of exploring reaction paths in computational chemistry.
N-Ethylbuphedrone, a stimulant

Entertainment
Neb (or Nebuchadnezzar), a character in the novel Castaways of the Flying Dutchman by Brian Jacques
Neb (or Nebuchadnezzar), a character in English translations of the novel Mysterious Island by Jules Verne (in the original French the names are Nab and Nabuchadnasar)
Neb (or Nebuchadnezzar), the name of the ship the main character pilot through Zion, in the film trilogy 'The Matrix'.

Places
River Neb, one of the principal rivers on the Isle of Man